Leeona June Dorrian, Lady Dorrian PC, KC (born 16 June 1957) is a Scottish advocate and judge who has served as the Lord Justice Clerk since 2016. She is the first woman to hold the position. She has been a Senator of the College of Justice since 2005, having served as a temporary judge for three years prior.

Early life

Dorrian was born in Edinburgh and educated at Cranley Girls' School in the city. She studied at the School of Law of the University of Aberdeen, graduating LL.B. in 1977, and was admitted to the Faculty of Advocates in 1981.

Early career

Dorrian served as Standing Junior Counsel to the Health and Safety Executive and Commission between 1987 and 1994, Advocate Depute between 1988 and 1991, and as Standing Junior to the Department of Energy between 1991 and 1994. She was appointed Queen's Counsel in 1994, and called to the English Bar in 1991, at the Inner Temple. Between 1997 and 2001 she was a member of the Criminal Injuries Compensation Board.

College of Justice 

Dorrian was appointed a Temporary Judge of the Court of Session in 2002, and in 2005 became a full-time Senator of the College of Justice, taking the judicial title, Lady Dorrian.
She was promoted to the Inner House in 2012.

Lady Dorrian became a member of The Management Board of The Aberdeen Law Project in 2010. She was elected a Fellow of the Royal Society of Edinburgh in 2022.

Lord Justice Clerk 

In April 2016, Lady Dorrian was appointed as Lord Justice Clerk, succeeding Lord Carloway who had been promoted to Lord President of the Court of Session. She is the first woman to serve as Lord Justice Clerk,
and at the time of her appointment was one of 9 women out of 31 judges in Scotland.

Lady Dorrian has been involved in the trial of former First Minister, Alex Salmond for sexual misconduct  for which he was acquitted. She also permitted the application for a ban on publication of the names of the complainers in that trial and a ban on the publication of any material that could identify any complainer. Blogger and former British ambassador to Uzbekistan, Craig Murray, has since been jailed for eight months for providing information in his blog that may allow readers to identify some of the complainers by "jigsaw identification". This incarceration, wherein Lady Dorrian delivered the "Opinion of the Court", has caused some media attention.

See also

List of Senators of the College of Justice

References

 

1957 births
Living people
Alumni of the University of Aberdeen
Members of the Faculty of Advocates
Members of the Privy Council of the United Kingdom
Lawyers from Edinburgh
20th-century King's Counsel
21st-century King's Counsel
Scottish King's Counsel
Senators of the College of Justice
Scottish women judges
British women lawyers
People educated at St Margaret's School, Edinburgh
Lords Justice Clerk
20th-century women lawyers
Fellows of the Royal Society of Edinburgh